The 1962 Michigan gubernatorial election was held on November 6, 1962. Incumbent Democrat John B. Swainson was defeated by Republican George W. Romney who got 51.36% of the vote.

As of 2022, this is the most recent election in which an incumbent governor lost re-election after serving one term.

General election

Candidates
Major party candidates
George W. Romney, Republican
John B. Swainson, Democratic

Other candidates
James Sim, Socialist Labor

Results

Primaries 
The primary elections occurred on August 7, 1962.

Democratic primary

Republican primary

References

1962
Michigan
Gubernatorial
November 1962 events in the United States
George W. Romney